Gresham School District is a school district in the U.S. state of Oregon. It serves the communities of Boring, Damascus and Gresham.

Demographics
In the 2009 school year, the district had 145 students classified as homeless by the Department of Education, or 1.2% of students in the district.

Elementary schools
Deep Creek - Damascus
East Gresham - Gresham
East Orient - Gresham
Hall - Gresham
Highland - Gresham
Hogan Cedars - Gresham
Hollydale - Gresham
Kelly Creek - Gresham
North Gresham - Gresham
Powell Valley - Gresham

Middle schools
Clear Creek - Gresham
Damascus - Damascus
Dexter McCarty - Gresham
Gordon Russell - Gresham
West Orient - Gresham

High schools
Gresham High School
Sam Barlow High School
Springwater Trail High School

Charter schools
Center for Advanced Learning
Gresham-Barlow Web Academy

References

External links
Gresham-Barlow School District

School districts in Oregon
Education in Clackamas County, Oregon
Education in Multnomah County, Oregon
Education in Gresham, Oregon